Dean Turner may refer to:

Dean Turner (footballer) (born 1959), former Australian rules footballer
Dean Turner (ice hockey) (born 1958), retired American professional ice hockey defenseman 
Dean Turner (musician) (1972–2009), Australian rock musician and record producer